The 2020–21 Toto Cup Al was the 36th season of the third-important football tournament in Israel since its introduction and the 15th tournament involving Israeli Premier League clubs only.

Beitar Jerusalem were the defending champions.

Format changes 
The two clubs playing in the Israel Super Cup (Maccabi Tel Aviv and Hapoel Be'er Sheva) will not take part in the group stage, while the remaining twelve clubs were divided into three groups of four clubs. At the end of the group stage the team with the best results of the group winners will qualify to the Finals.
Maccabi Tel Aviv and Hapoel Be'er Sheva will play (in the 2020 Israel Super Cup match) for a place in the finals.
All the clubs will participate in classification play-offs.

Group stage 
Groups were allocated according to geographic distribution of the clubs, with the northern clubs allocated to Group A, and the center clubs allocated to Group B and group C. Each club will play the other clubs once.

The matches are scheduled to start in August 2020.

Group A

Group B

Group C

Ranking of first-placed teams

Ranking of second-placed teams

Ranking of third-placed teams

Ranking of fourth-placed teams

Israel Super Cup

Classification play-offs

13–14th classification match

11–12th classification match

9–10th classification match

7–8th classification match

5–6th classification match

3–4th classification match

Final

Final rankings

References 

Toto Cup seasons
2020–21 in Israeli football
2020–21 European domestic association football cups